Mirania may refer to:
 Mirania (spider), a junior synonym of Perania, a genus of spiders
 Mirania people, or Bora, an ethnic group of the Amazon
 Mirania language, or Bora, their language

See also 
 Miranha (cicada), a genus of cicadas
 Merania, a fiefdom of the Holy Roman Empire

Language and nationality disambiguation pages